Pithecops is a genus of butterflies in the family Lycaenidae erected by Thomas Horsfield in 1828.

Species include:
Pithecops hylax Horsfield 1828 - forest Quaker
Pithecops fulgens Doherty 1889 - blue Quaker
Pithecops mariae de Nicéville, 1894 Sumatra, Borneo.
Pithecops dionisius (Boisduval, 1832) Moluccas, New Guinea, Bismarck Archipelage, Solomon Islands
Pithecops phoenix (Röber, 1886) Celebes
Pithecops corvus Fruhstorfer, 1919

References

 
Lycaenidae genera